Jeremiah "Jerry" Kane (October 11, 1865 – October 25, 1948) was a professional baseball player. After his playing career, Kane was a minor league baseball manager for several teams. He went on to have a career in politics in his hometown of East St. Louis, Illinois.

Kane served as chairman for the Illinois State Democratic Committee from 1906 to 1914, after completing two four-year terms as the comptroller for East St. Louis.

References

Major League Baseball first basemen
Major League Baseball catchers
St. Louis Browns (AA) players
Johnstown (minor league baseball) players
Quincy Ravens players
Davenport Pilgrims players
Rockford Hustlers players
Minor league baseball managers
Baseball players from Illinois
1865 births
1949 deaths
Illinois local politicians
19th-century baseball players
Sportspeople from East St. Louis, Illinois